was a town located in Kawachi District, Tochigi Prefecture, Japan.

As of 2003, the town had an estimated population of 9,510 and a density of 166.96 persons per km2. The total area was 56.96 km2.

On March 31, 2007, Kamikawachi, along with the town of Kawachi (also from Kawachi District), was merged into the expanded city of Utsunomiya.

Dissolved municipalities of Tochigi Prefecture